Borislav Stevanović (22 September 1975 – 24 January 2022) was a Serbian footballer who played at both professional and international levels as a striker.

Career
Stevanović played club football in Yugoslavia, Spain and Romania for Radnički Niš, Mérida, Rad, Zemun, Universitatea Craiova and BASK.

He also earned one cap for Yugoslavia in 2001.

Personal life
Stevanović was born in Kosovska Mitrovica on 22 September 1975. He died on 24 January 2022, at the age of 46.

References

1975 births
2022 deaths
Serbia and Montenegro footballers
Association football forwards
Expatriate footballers in Romania
Expatriate footballers in Spain
FC U Craiova 1948 players
FK BASK players
FK Rad players
FK Radnički Niš players
FK Zemun players
Serbia and Montenegro expatriate footballers
Serbia and Montenegro international footballers
Sportspeople from Mitrovica, Kosovo